Zhu is the pinyin romanization of five Chinese surnames: 朱, 祝, 竺, 猪 and 諸.

The most prominent of the five, Zhu (朱), is the 17th name in the Hundred Family Surnames poem and was the surname of the Ming dynasty emperors. It is alternatively spelled Chu (primarily in Hong Kong, Macau and Taiwan), Gee in the United States & Canada, and Choo (mostly in Singapore and Malaysia). As of 2018, it is the 14th most common surname in the People's Republic of China, with a population of around 18 million.

Name 
One interpretation is that 朱 refers to 朱雀 meaning vermillion. This is a completely different character from another Chu (楚), which is less common than Zhu.

Origin and distribution 
The ancestral surname (姓) of the ruling family of the State of Zhu (邾) was Cao. (p. 144, Xueqin).  The State of Zou, as it was later renamed, was conquered and annexed by the state of Chu during the reign of King Xuan of Chu (369–340 BC).  (p. 43, Chao).  The ruling family and its descendants adopted Zhu (朱) as their surname in memory of their former state of Zhu (邾).  (p. 43, Chao & p. 239, Tan).

During the Ming dynasty, some people of the Zhu clan moved to Taiwan, and others later migrated to Southeast Asia, Europe and the Americas. During the Qing dynasty the House of Zhu was purged by the House of Aisin-Gioro and the Manchu people who led the Qing armies. Many royal family members of the House of Zhu were executed at Caishikou Execution Grounds during the Qing dynasty. The Zhu clan is also found in Korea and is known as: 주 (朱; Ju, Joo); it is the 32nd most common name in Korea though it is combined with the Zhou (周) surname.

Zhu (朱) is technically a branch of the Cao (曹) surname. Nowadays, Zhu is 14th most common, while Cao is 27th most common in terms of population size.

A 2013 study found that it was the 14th most common surnames, shared by 17,000,000 people or 1.280% of the population, with the province with the most being Jiangsu.

Notable people surnamed 朱

Historical figures
 Zhu Jun (Han dynasty), politician during the late Han dynasty; also a character in the Romance of the Three Kingdoms
 Zhu Ling, General of Cao Wei during the Three Kingdoms period 
 Zhu Zhi, military general of Eastern Wu during the Three Kingdoms era of China
 Zhu Huan, military general of Eastern Wu during the Three Kingdoms era of China
 Zhu Ju, military general of Eastern Wu during the Three Kingdoms era of China
 Zhu Ran, military general of Eastern Wu during the Three Kingdoms era of China
 Zhu Can, an agrarian rebel leader during the disintegration of the Sui dynasty
 Zhu Jingze, official during the Tang dynasty and Wu Zetian's Zhou dynasty
 Zhu Mei, general during the Tang dynasty
 Zhu Pu, an official of the Tang dynasty, serving briefly as a chancellor during the reign of Emperor Zhaozong
 Zhu Jin, a warlord in the late Tang dynasty
 Zhu Ci, general and military governor under the Tang dynasty
 Zhu Tao, general under the Tang dynasty
 Zhu Kerong, grandson of Zhu Tao and military governor under the Tang dynasty
 Zhu Yansi, general of the Tang dynasty
 Zhu Xicai, general and military governor under the Tang dynasty
 Zhu Quanzhong, founder of the Later Liang
 Zhu Yougui, second emperor of the Later Liang
 Zhu Youzhen, third emperor of the Later Liang
Zhu Bajie, character of the 16th century novel Journey to the West.
 Zhu Yuanzhang, Founding Emperor of the Ming dynasty
 Zhu Yunwen, Second Emperor of the Ming dynasty 
 Zhu Biao, the Hongwu Emperor's first son and Crown Prince 
 Zhu Quan, Prince of Ning, Seventeenth son of the Hongwu Emperor and younger half-brother to the Yongle Emperor; military commander, historian and playwright
 Zhu Zaiyu, Prince of Zheng, a sixth-generation descendant of the Hongxi Emperor, the fourth emperor of the Ming dynasty; a musician and one of the first people to describe equal temperament in music in 1584
 Zhu Chenhao, Prince of Ning; 5th generation descendant of Zhu Quan, Prince of Ning; a rebel Prince
 Zhu Zhifan, Prince of Anhua; a rebel Prince
 Zhu Changqing, Prince of Huai, Ming pretender reigning as Emperor Dongwu of the Southern Ming dynasty
 Hongguang Emperor, born Zhu Yousong, Prince of Fu; Ming pretender and emperor of the Southern Ming dynasty which resisted the Qing dynasty
 Longwu Emperor, born Zhu Yujian, Prince of Tang; Ming pretender and emperor of the Southern Ming dynasty
 Yongli Emperor, born Zhu Youlang, Prince of Gui; Ming pretender and emperor of the Southern Ming dynasty
 Prince of Lu, born Zhu Yihai; a leader of the Southern Ming dynasty
 Prince of Ningjing, born Zhu Shugui; ninth-generation descendant of Zhu Yuanzhang, the founder of the Ming dynasty of China, via the line of his 15th son, Zhu Zhi, the Prince of Liao; a leader of the Southern Ming dynasty
 Koxinga whose title literally means Lord with the Imperial Surname; he was born Zheng Chenggong but given the right to bear the imperial surname, Zhu, by the Longwu Emperor, a pretender to the then collapsing Ming dynasty, for his noteworthy loyalist efforts; Koxinga founded the short-lived Kingdom of Taiwan

Government, politics and military
 Zhu Guohua, grandson of Zhu De and sentenced to death for rape
 Zhu Fulin, former deputy mayor of Jinhua and sentenced to life imprisonment for bribery
 Cyrus Chu (born 1955), Minister of National Science Council of the Republic of China (2011–2014)
 Zhu Binhou, a military aviation pioneer and WWI veteran pilot who flown combat missions for the Armée de l'Air 
 Zhu Maichen, an impoverished student working as woodcutter; his wife divorced him to remarry a richer man; subsequently he became a provincial governor under Emperor Wu of Han; he rejected his ex-wife's subsequent attempts at reconciliation and is credited with the Chinese proverb:  "Poured water cannot be retrieved". His biography is recorded in Volume 64 of the Book of Han
 Zhu Youqian, a warlord in the late Tang dynasty, he was falsely accused of plotting a rebellion and Emperor Zhuangong put him and his entire family to death
 Ju Hala (Sinicized: 朱氏), a Manchu clan during the Qing dynasty, perhaps founded by and composed of assimilated Han Chinese of the Zhu surname.  One example might be Zhu Guozhi (朱國治), a Chinese Bannerman in the Eight Banners during the Qing dynasty who was appointed the governor of Yunnan.  He was captured by Wu Sangui in 1674 and died cursing the rebels.  In 1742, he was included into the Temple of Patriots.  Zhu Hongzhang could possibly be regarded as another example. The Marquis of Extended Grace and his heirs, who were the officially designated heirs of the Ming dynasty by the Qing dynasty, were inducted into the Plain White Banner of the Eight Banners system
 Zhu Hongzhang, a loyalist general during the Qing dynasty; he helped put down the Taiping Rebellion
 Zhu Zhixin, comrade of Sun Yat-sen who named Zhixin High School after his dead comrade
 Zhu Shaoliang, general in the National Revolutionary Army of the Republic of China
 Zhu Lühe, a politician and judicial officer in the Republic of China; he became an important politician during the Reformed Government of the Republic of China and the Wang Jingwei regime
 Zhu Shen, a politician and public prosecutor in the Republic of China; he became an important politician during the Provisional Government of the Republic of China and the Wang Jingwei regime
 Zhu Pei-De, General
 Zhu De, co-founder of the Chinese Red Army, forerunner of the People's Liberation Army
 Zhu Qi, general of the People's Liberation Army; currently commander of the Beijing Military Region
 Zhu Jiahua, famous politician of the Republic of China
 Sir Moilin Jean Ah-Chuen, a Sino-Mauritian politician and business man from Mauritius. He became First Chinese Cabinet Minister from 1967 to 1976 and First Chinese Member, Legislative Council in 1949. He was knighted by Queen Elizabeth II.
 Zhu Rongji, former PRC Premier; he is a direct descendant of the Hongwu Emperor of the Ming dynasty
 David S. C. Chu, United States Under Secretary of Defense appointed by George W. Bush
 Jim Chu, Chief Constable of the Vancouver Police Department
 Zhu Qizhen, former Vice Foreign Minister and Ambassador to the United States
 Steven Chu, the 12th United States Secretary of Energy
 Eric Chu, a former Vice Premier of the Republic of China; subsequently the first Mayor of New Taipei
 Choo Han Teck, a Judge of the Supreme Court of Singapore
 Susan Chu, wife of former Taiwan (ROC) Vice President Vincent Siew
 Zhu Hailun, Deputy Party Secretary of the Xinjiang Uyghur Autonomous Region
 Carmen Chu, Assessor-Recorder of the City and County of San Francisco since 2013
 Zhu Fenglian, Deputy Director and Spokesperson of the Information Bureau at the Taiwan Affairs Office of the State Council since 2019
 Chu Yiu-ming, One of the founders of the Occupy Central
 Samuel Chu, Founder and President of The Campaign for Hong Kong

Philosophy and religion
 Zhu Xi, Song-dynasty scholar and main proponent for Neo-Confucianism; he was elevated to a position of honor in the Temple of Confucius several decades after his death and recognized as the third sage of Confucianism after Confucius and Mencius during the reign of the Kangxi Emperor of the Qing dynasty
 Zhu Qianzhi, Chinese intellectual and historian; influenced Mao Zedong

Arts
 Zhu Da, renowned painter and calligrapher of the Qing dynasty; agnatic descendant of Zhu Quan, Prince of Ning
 Zhu Dake, Chinese scholar, cultural critic and essayist
 Zhu Ziqing, renowned writer and poet
 Zhu Jian'er, a prominent Chinese composer
 Zhu Xiao-Mei, Chinese classical pianist and teacher 
 Chu Yibing, cellist
 Zhu Xiao Di, Chinese-American writer 
 Zhu Wen, Chinese short story writer turned director
 Joyce Chu, Malaysian singer-songwriter and actress.

Science and technology
 Zhu Shijie, Chinese mathematician
 Steven Chu, one of three co-recipients of the 1997 Nobel Prize in Physics; 12th US Secretary of Energy
 Chu Ching-wu, renowned physicist; expert on superconductivity
 Gilbert Chu, professor of medicine and biochemistry at Stanford Medical School; older brother of Steven Chu, the 12th US Secretary of Energy
 Eric Inho Chu, former WHO Regional Director of Africa; Pioneer of South Korean Public Health
 Jun Zhu, statistician and entomologist
 Zhu Xiping, professor of mathematics at Sun Yat-sen University; winner of the 2004 Morningside Medal of Mathematics at the Third International Congress of Chinese Mathematicians (ICCM)
 Zhu Qingshi, famous chemist, member of the Royal Society of Chemistry. He was the former president of the University of Science and Technology of China. He was also a delegate of the 8th and 9th National People's Congress, and the 10th National Committee of the Chinese People's Political Consultative Conference.

Business
 Zhu Chuanfeng, businessman sentenced to death for selling gutter oil
 Zhu Chuanqing, businessman sentenced to life in prison for selling gutter oil
 Zhu Chuanbo, businessman sentenced to life in prison for selling gutter oil
 David Chu, Taiwanese-American, founder of Nautica, men's designer outerwear company
 Zhu Baoguo, Chinese billionaire, founder of Joincare Pharmaceutical Group Industrial
 Zhu Gongshan, Chinese billionaire, founder of GCL-Poly Energy Holdings Limited, an energy supplier in China
 Zhu Huiming, Chinese billionaire, founder of Hangzhou Binjiang Real Estate Group
 Zhu Jun (businessman), Chinese industrialist and businessman; Chairman of Nasdaq listed company, the Nine City (NASDAQ: NCTY); also chairman of the Shanghai Shenhua football club.
 Chu Lam Yiu (朱林瑤), Chairwoman and CEO, Huabao International Holdings
 Zhu Mengyi (朱孟依), Chairman of Guangdong Zhujiang Invest, Hopson Development
 Zhu Xingliang, Chinese billionaire, founder of Suzhou Gold Mantis Construction Decoration
 Zhu Xinli, Chinese multi-millionaire, founder and chairman of China Huiyuan Juice Group
 Zhu Yicai, Chinese billionaire, founder and chairman of China Yurun Group
 Zhu Yunlai, CEO of China International Capital Corp; he is the son of Zhu Rongji, former Premier of the People's Republic of China, and a direct descendant of the Hongwu Emperor of the Ming dynasty
 Abehymann Zhu, Managing Director of APX World Logistics Inc., a Shanghai-based 3PL provider formed in July 1993

Sports and entertainment
 Alex "Xpecial" Chu, American League of Legends player
 Choo Hoey, Singaporean musician and conductor; formerly Music Director of the Singapore Symphony Orchestra
 Choo Seng Quee, former national football coach of Indonesia, Malaysia and Singapore.
 Ken Chu, F4 member
 Dadawa, real name Zhu Zheqin; singer/songwriter/indie producer, who is well known for her vocalization
 Julie Chu, U.S. Olympic Team hockey player
 Jon M. Chu, American film director and screenwriter
 Loletta Chu, Ethnic Chinese from Myanmar; winner of the 1977 Miss Hong Kong Pageant
 Athena Chu (朱茵), Hong Kong Actress
 Zhu Jianhua, P.R.C. Olympic high jumper
 Zhu Lin, a Chinese badminton player
 Zhu Ling (volleyball), a Chinese volleyball player who competed in the 1984 Summer Olympics
 Chu Mu-yen 朱木炎, Hakka Chinese; Gold medalist, Taekwondo, 2004 Athens Olympics; Champion, World Taekwondo Championships, 2003
 Zhu Xiaolin, a Chinese long-distance runner, who specialises in marathon running; won the Xiamen International Marathon and was third at the 2010 Rotterdam Marathon. She represented China at the 2008 Beijing Olympics
 Zhu Yilong, Chinese actor and singer
 Zhu Yunying, Chinese volleyball player
 Zhu Zhengting, Chinese singer, dancer and actor, former member of Nine Percent and member of NEXT
 Zhu Zhu, Chinese actress and singer who rose to fame as a host for MTV China

Miscellaneous
 Zhu Haiyang, Virginia Tech murderer who decapitated Yang Xin
 Zhu Xianjian, North Korean defector and robber
 Morgan Chu, an intellectual property attorney and one of the first Asian Americans to lead a major U.S. law, Irell & Manella LLP; younger brother of Steven Chu, the 12th US Secretary of Energy
 Zhu Ling (poisoning victim), victim of an unsolved 1995 thallium poisoning case in Beijing, China
 Zhu Min (economist), Chinese economist and is Deputy Managing Director of the International Monetary Fund

Foreign
 Chu Văn An (朱文安), a Confucian, teacher, physician and high-ranking mandarin of the Trần dynasty in Đại Việt
 Châu Văn Tiếp (朱文接), an 18th-century Vietnamese military commander, best known for his role as a general of Nguyễn Ánh
 Sinan Joo clan, a Korean clan descended from Neo-Confucian philosopher Zhu Xi
 Ju Ji-hoon (朱智勳), model and actor from South Korea

See also 
Zhu (state)
House of Zhu

References

Reading 

 Brook, Timothy, 1998, The Confucian of Pleasure:  Commerce and Culture in Ming China, University of California Press.  
 Chao, Sheau-yueh J., 2000, "In Search of Your Asian Roots:  Genealogical Research on Chinese Surnames", Clearfield.  
 Li, Chi, 1967, "The Formation of the Chinese People:  An Anthropological Inquiry", Russell & Russell.  U.S. Library of Congress Card No:  66-27117.
 Li Xueqin, 1985 "Eastern Zhou and Qin Civilizations", (K.C. Chang trans.). Yale University Press. 
 Mote, F.W., 1999, "Imperial China 900 - 1800", Harvard University Press.  
 Paludan, Ann, 1998, "Chronicle of the Chinese Emperors:  The Reign-By-Reign Record of the Rulers of Imperial China", Thames & Hudson. 
 Paludan, Ann, 1981, "The Imperial Ming Imperial Tombs", Yale University Press.  
 Tan, Thomas Tsu-wee, 1986, "Your Chinese Roots:  The Overseas Chinese Story", Times Books International.  
 Wu, Kuo-Cheng, 1982, The Chinese Heritage. Crown Publishers, Inc.

External links 
Chinese surname history: Zhu
Hua Mulan
Nobel Prize: Steven Chu

Chinese-language surnames
Multiple Chinese surnames

de:Zhu